The 1891 Canadian federal election was held on March 5, 1891, to elect members of the House of Commons of Canada of the 7th Parliament of Canada. It was won by the Conservative Party of Prime Minister Sir John A. Macdonald. 

The main issue of the 1891 campaign was Macdonald's National Policy, a policy of protective tariffs. The Liberals supported reciprocity (free trade) with the United States.

Macdonald led a Conservative campaign emphasizing stability, and retained the Conservatives' majority in the House of Commons. It was a close election and he campaigned hard. Macdonald died a few months after the election, which led to his succession by four different Conservative Prime Ministers until the 1896 election.

It was Wilfrid Laurier's first election as leader of the Liberals. Although he lost the election, he increased the Liberals' support. He returned in 1896 to win a solid majority, despite losing the popular vote.

Canadian voters would return to the issue of free trade 20 years later in the 1911 federal election.

National results 

Notes:

* Party did not nominate candidates in the previous election.

1 One Nationalist candidate was elected by acclamation.

2 The Parliamentary website identifies two candidates in Nova Scotia as being "Progressives". This may be an error.

Acclamations:

The following Members of Parliament were elected by acclamation;
 British Columbia: 1 Conservative, 1 Liberal-Conservative
 Manitoba: 1 Conservative
 Ontario: 1 Conservative
 Quebec: 1 Conservative, 2 Liberal, 1 Nationalist

Results by province

See also
 
List of Canadian federal general elections
List of political parties in Canada
7th Canadian Parliament

Notes

References

Further reading

External links
The Election of 1891: A Question of Loyalty, by James Marsh

 Federal
1891
March 1891 events